Henriett Seth F. (born Fajcsák Henrietta, 27 October 1980), also known by the Hungarian pseudonym Seth F. Henriett,  is a Hungarian autistic savant poet, writer, musician and artist.

Childhood
Henriett did not make eye contact in her early childhood. In 1987, all the primary schools in her town refused to admit her because of her communication problems. She was placed in a music and art class, but she would not sing, so, in 1989, she was sent to a mentally handicapped primary school by two teachers, although she remained in the music and art class.

She played flute from the age of 8 and played contrabass at the age of 10–12, and until the age of 13, she was in many concerts in the Garrison and Soldiers of Club (in Hungarian: Helyorsegi Klub)

She was also found to have echolalia, communications problems and repetitive behaviors. She was diagnosed with childhood autism by Hungarian Autism Research Group (Autizmus Alapítvány és Kutatócsoport) and two psychiatries of Eger.

Henriett started writing between the ages of nine and thirteen. She painted autistic art paintings to the House of Arts, Eger, and Hotel Stadion of Budapest in the East-European Autism Conference, 2004.

Adulthood

Education
She won the Géza Gárdonyi Prize at the age of 18 for her art and literature. Henriett went to Eszterházy Károly College at the age of 18 to the Psychology Institution. She has Raven IQ above 140 and Magyar Wechsler Intelligence Test(MAWI) IQ above 120 with part some under IQ 90, so she was considered an autistic savant.

Writing career
Henriett was invited to the Friderikusz Sándor's documentary film, to Szólás Szabadsága ("Freedom of Speech"), in 2005, that was seen by 700,000 people. This documentary film was entitled Esőlány ("Rain Girl"). In 2006 Henriett wrote one novel, Autizmus – Egy másik világ ("Autism – Another World"). That work was published by University of Pécs, in the New Galaxy anthology. Henriett won the 6th-place prize in the International Literature Competition in 2000, at the age of 19. She came in first in 2001, at the age of 20 (by International Alliance of Hungarian Writers).

In 2005, she wrote a book, Autizmussal önmagamba zárva ("Closed into myself with autism"), that was published by the Hungarian Autism Research Group and Ministry for National Cultural Heritage.

Monodramas
In 2010, Orlai Produkciós Iroda made a monodrama, Nemsenkilény, monológ nemmindegyembereknek ("Notanobodycreature"), from book of Henriett Seth F. The textbook contains details of Donna Williams's Nobody Nowhere: The extraordinary Autobiography of an Autistic Girl few lines, Birger Sellin's Don't want to Be Inside Me Anymore: Messages from Autistic Mind few lines and a few lines by Mark Haddon's: The Curious Incident of the Dog in the Night-time. That played in Esztergom, Budapest, Pécs, Tatabánya, Székesfehérvár and Eger theatres and made from it TV documentary in Hungarian Television, 2010, and Budapest, Gyöngyös theatres in 2011.

End of career
She gave up her creative music career altogether at the age of 13, her creative writing career at the age of 25. She also gave up painting before the age of 27. 

She showed her last art work in Brody Sandor Public Library in June 2007. 

Henriett Seth F.'s life and arts can be compared to Arthur Rimbaud's life and arts after her "Little Wassily Kandinsky"'s early childhood savant syndrome years. Henriett universal effect of all that was what we now call autism and savant syndrome. and National Talents Support Council, Particular Educational Talents Support Council, Budapest, Hungary: Henriett Seth F. – The Rain Girl Artist.

Disabilities
Seth has childhood autism, mitral valve prolapse, nearsightedness, astigmatism, strabismus, three autoimmune disorders, orthopedic diseases and other physical disorders.

Works

In Hungarian
 Henriett Seth F.' s unpublished poems from her childhood and teen years before the age 25 with title It may be...; Autumn; Well, don't speak this child; Something easy to write and sweet; There in the distance; Silently; Somewhere; A dream in a cage; Liberation from the slavery of the soul and Poem to the patron, on title 2nd Existence, infinity, and the world years between (1989–2005)
 Winner of the XIIth and XIIIth International Literature Competition(2000–2001) International Alliance of Hungarian Writers
 Novels to the periodical New Face, (2001)
 Autizmussal önmagamba zárva ("Closed into myself with autism") by Henriett Seth F. to Hungarian Autism Research Group and Ministry for the National Cultural Heritage (2005)
 Autizmus – Egy másik világ ("Autism – Another World") by Henriett Seth F. to University of Pécs (2006)
 Novel to the periodical Esőember ("Rain Man") (2006) by Henriett Seth F. from her kindergarten's, primary school's and Eszterhazy College's life

Exhibitions
 Henriett Seth F.' s paintings and galleries in House of Arts and Brody Sandor Public Library, Eger, 1993–2007

TV documentaries
 Henriett Seth F. on the first digitized videos of childhood autism and savant syndrome on Hungary on investigations and language development with her photos of paintings by Hungarian Autism Research Group, 2002 
 Friderikusz Sándor.: "Seth F. Henriett: Esőlány", ("The Rain Girl") – Freedom of Speech, Hungarian Television, 2005
 Monodrama from book of Henriett Seth F.: Nemsenkilény, monológ nemmindegyembereknek

Theatres
 Monodrama from book of Henriett Seth F., text book contains details of Donna Williams, Birger Sellin and Mark Haddon: Nemsenkilény, monológ nemmindegyembereknek ("Notanobodycreature") in Esztergom' s Theatre by Orlai Produkciós Iroda, 2010
 Monodrama from book of Henriett Seth F., text book contains details of Donna Williams, Birger Sellin and Mark Haddon: Nemsenkilény, monológ nemmindegyembereknek ("Notanobodycreature") in Budapest Trafó House of Contemporary Arts by Orlai Produkciós Iroda, 2010, 2011
 Monodrama from book of Henriett Seth F., text book contains details of Donna Williams, Birger Sellin and Mark Haddon: Nemsenkilény, monológ nemmindegyembereknek ("Notanobodycreature") in Pécs' s Harmadik Theatre by Orlai Produkciós Iroda, 2010
 Monodrama from book of Henriett Seth F., text book contains details of Donna Williams, Birger Sellin and Mark Haddon: Nemsenkilény, monológ nemmindegyembereknek ("Notanobodycreature") in Tatabánya' s Jászai Mari Theatre by Orlai Produkciós Iroda, 2010
 Monodrama from book of Henriett Seth F., text book contains details of Donna Williams, Birger Sellin and Mark Haddon: Nemsenkilény, monológ nemmindegyembereknek ("Notanobodycreature") in Székesfehérvár' s Vörösmarty Theatre by Orlai Produkciós Iroda, 2010
 Monodrama from book of Henriett Seth F., text book contains details of Donna Williams, Birger Sellin and Mark Haddon: Nemsenkilény, monológ nemmindegyembereknek ("Notanobodycreature") in Eger' s Gárdonyi Géza Theatre by Orlai Produkciós Iroda, 2010
 Monodrama from book of Henriett Seth F., text book contains details of Donna Williams, Birger Sellin and Mark Haddon: Nemsenkilény, monológ nemmindegyembereknek ("Notanobodycreature") in Budapest' s Radnóti Színház by Orlai Produkciós Iroda, 2011
 Monodrama from book of Henriett Seth F., text book contains details of Donna Williams, Birger Sellin and Mark Haddon: Nemsenkilény, monológ nemmindegyembereknek ("Notanobodycreature") in Gyöngyös' s Mátra Művelődési Központ by Orlai Produkciós Iroda, 2011

Criticism

 Henriett Seth F.'s book Autizmussal önmagamba zárva ("Closed into myself with autism") by Alliance Safeguarding for Hungarian Autistic Children and Adults
 Henriett Seth F.'s book Autizmussal önmagamba zárva ("Closed into myself with autism") and Henriett Seth F. by Börcsök Enikő, title with Megoszthatatlan belső magány ("Indivisible internal solitude")
 Henriett Seth F.'s book Autizmus – Egy másik világ ("Autism – Another World") by Magazine Solaria Science Fiction

See also
 Autistic art
 Autistic savant
 List of child prodigies
 List of music prodigies
 List of pseudonyms

Further reading

  [ Article (Rain Girl) from Henriett Seth F.] – Contains biography of Henriett, paintings and photos by Dr. Darold Treffert
  Documentary film from Henriett Seth F. – Contains autism and savant syndrome from Henriett, title with Esőlány ("The Rain Girl") – Freedom of Speech in Hungarian Television by Friderikusz Sandor, 2005

References

External links

 

 Henriett Seth F.' s international influences: Arts in Difference – Contains Arts in Difference: Henriett Seth F., Nemsenkilény, monológ nemmindegyembereknek "Notanobodycreature", 2010

1980 births
Autistic savants
Hungarian painters
21st-century Hungarian poets
Hungarian women artists
Hungarian women poets
Hungarian women novelists
Living people
People from Eger
21st-century Hungarian novelists
Hungarian people with disabilities
Artists with autism
21st-century Hungarian women writers